The 1979–80 season was the 10th season of the Portland Trail Blazers in the National Basketball Association (NBA). The Blazers lost seven more games than the previous season, ending with a record of 38–44, their first losing record since the 1975–76 season; despite that, they qualified for the playoffs for the fourth consecutive season.

The Blazers were ousted from the 1980 NBA Playoffs after losing their best-of-three series to the Seattle SuperSonics, two games to one.

The Blazers' season was documented in The Breaks of the Game, a book published in 1981 by journalist David Halberstam. The Breaks of the Game was a New York Times best-seller and is considered one of the greatest sports books ever written.

Draft picks

Note:  This is not a complete list; only the first two rounds are covered, as well as any other picks by the franchise who played at least one NBA game.

Roster

Regular season

Season standings

z - clinched division title
y - clinched division title
x - clinched playoff spot

Record vs. opponents

Game log

Playoffs

|- align="center" bgcolor="#ffcccc"
| 1
| April 2
| @ Seattle
| L 110–120
| Ron Brewer (24)
| Kermit Washington (7)
| Kermit Washington (12)
| Kingdome26,412
| 0–1
|- align="center" bgcolor="#ccffcc"
| 2
| April 4
| Seattle
| W 105–95 (OT)
| Natt, R. Brewer (27)
| Jim Brewer (12)
| T. R. Dunn (4)
| Memorial Coliseum12,666
| 1–1
|- align="center" bgcolor="#ffcccc"
| 3
| April 6
| @ Seattle
| L 86–103
| Billy Ray Bates (26)
| Tom Owens (16)
| Billy Ray Bates (3)
| Kingdome23,546
| 1–2
|-

Player statistics

Season

Playoffs

Awards and honors
 Calvin Natt, All-NBA Rookie Team
 Kermit Washington, NBA All-Defensive Second Team

Transactions

References

Portland Trail Blazers seasons
Portland Trail Blazers 1979
Portland Trail Blazers 1979
Port
Portland
Portland